Katha nankunshanica is a moth of the family Erebidae. It is found in Guangdong, China.

The forewings are greyish-yellow and the hindwings are pure yellow.

References

External links

Moths described in 2012
Endemic fauna of China
Lithosiina
Moths of Asia